It was a Dacian fortified town.

References

External links 
Cetatea dacică de la Cotnari

Dacian fortresses in Iași County
History of Western Moldavia